Belgium competed at the 1976 Winter Paralympics in Örnsköldsvik, Sweden. 5 competitors from Belgium won 0 medals and finished 10th in the medal table.

Cross-country 

The following five athletes competed in cross-country events:

 Roger Hendrickx
 Remi Standaert
 Andre van der Bussche
 Julien van Herreweghe
 Lucien van Rennebog

They competed in the following three events:

 Men's Short Distance 10 km A
 Men's Short Distance 10 km B
 Men's 3x10 km Relay A-B

See also 

 Belgium at the Paralympics
 Belgium at the 1976 Winter Olympics

References 

1976
1976 in Belgian sport
Nations at the 1976 Winter Paralympics